Franz Josef Conrad (April 12, 1944 – September 12, 1985) was a German politician of the Christian Democratic Union (CDU) and former member of the German Bundestag.

Life 
He had been a member of the Junge Union since 1961 and a member of the CDU since 1963. In 1970 he became a member of the CDU's state executive committee and in 1972 deputy state chairman.

From 1974 to 1977 Conrad was a member of the municipal council of Riegelsberg. From 1976 until his death in 1985 he was a member of the German Bundestag on behalf of the CDU. In 1976 and 1980 he was elected via the state list of Saarland; in 1983 he was able to win the direct mandate in the constituency of Saarbrücken II.

Literature

References

1944 births
1985 deaths
Members of the Bundestag for Saarland
Members of the Bundestag 1983–1987
Members of the Bundestag 1980–1983
Members of the Bundestag 1976–1980
Members of the Bundestag for the Christian Democratic Union of Germany